In physics, the Rayleigh–Jeans law is an approximation to the spectral radiance of electromagnetic radiation as a function of wavelength from a black body at a given temperature through classical arguments. For wavelength λ, it is:

For frequency , the expression is instead

The Rayleigh–Jeans law agrees with experimental results at large wavelengths (low frequencies) but strongly disagrees at short wavelengths (high frequencies). This inconsistency between observations and the predictions of classical physics is commonly known as the ultraviolet catastrophe. Planck's law, which gives the correct radiation at all frequencies, has the Rayleigh–Jeans law as its low-frequency limit.

Historical development

In 1900, the British physicist Lord Rayleigh derived the λ−4 dependence of the Rayleigh–Jeans law based on classical physical arguments, relying upon the equipartition theorem. This law predicted an energy output that diverges towards infinity as wavelength approaches zero (as frequency tends to infinity).  Measurements of the spectral emission of actual black bodies revealed that the emission agreed with Rayleigh's calculation at low frequencies but diverged at high frequencies; reaching a maximum and then falling with frequency, so the total energy emitted is finite. Rayleigh recognized the unphysical behavior of his formula at high frequencies and introduced an ad hoc cutoff to correct it, but experimentalists found that his cutoff did not agree with data. Hendrik Lorentz also presented a derivation of the wavelength dependence in 1903. More complete derivations, which included the proportionality constant, were presented in 1905 by Rayleigh and Sir James Jeans and independently by Albert Einstein. Rayleigh believed that this discrepancy could be resolved by the equipartition theorem failing to be valid for high-frequency vibrations, while Jeans argued that the underlying cause was matter and luminiferous aether not being in thermal equilibrium.

Rayleigh published his first derivation of the frequency dependence in June 1900. Planck discovered the curve now known as Planck's law in October of that year and presented it in December. Planck's original intent was to find a satisfactory derivation of Wien's expression for the blackbody radiation curve, which accurately described the data at high frequencies. Planck found Wien's original derivation inadequate and devised his own. Then, after learning that the most recent experimental results disagreed with his predictions for low frequencies, Planck revised his calculation, obtaining what is now called Planck's law.

Comparison to Planck's law

In 1900 Max Planck empirically obtained an expression for black-body radiation expressed in terms of wavelength  (Planck's law):

where h is the Planck constant and  the Boltzmann constant.  The Planck's law does not suffer from an ultraviolet catastrophe, and agrees well with the experimental data, but its full significance (which ultimately led to quantum theory) was only appreciated several years later. Since,

then in the limit of high temperatures or long wavelengths, the term in the exponential becomes small, and the exponential is well approximated with the Taylor polynomial's first-order term,

So,

This results in Planck's blackbody formula reducing to

which is identical to the classically derived Rayleigh–Jeans expression.

The same argument can be applied to the blackbody radiation expressed in terms of frequency .

This last expression is the Rayleigh–Jeans law in the limit of small frequencies.

Consistency of frequency and wavelength dependent expressions

When comparing the frequency and wavelength dependent expressions of the Rayleigh–Jeans law it is important to remember that
 and

Therefore,

even after substituting the value , because  has units of energy emitted per unit time per unit area of emitting surface, per unit solid angle, per unit wavelength, whereas  has units of energy emitted per unit time per unit area of emitting surface, per unit solid angle, per unit frequency.  To be consistent, we must use the equality

where both sides now have units of power (energy emitted per unit time) per unit area of emitting surface, per unit solid angle.

Starting with the Rayleigh–Jeans law in terms of wavelength we get

where

This leads us to find:

Other forms of Rayleigh–Jeans law

Depending on the application, the Planck function can be expressed in 3 different forms.  The first involves energy emitted per unit time per unit area of emitting surface, per unit solid angle, per spectral unit.  In this form, the Planck function and associated Rayleigh–Jeans limits are given by

or

Alternatively, Planck's law can be written as an expression  for emitted power integrated over all solid angles.  In this form, the Planck function and associated Rayleigh–Jeans limits are given by

or

In this form, the Planck function and associated Rayleigh–Jeans limits are given by

or

See also
 Stefan–Boltzmann law
 Wien's displacement law
 Sakuma–Hattori equation

References

External links
 Derivation of Rayleigh-Jeans law
 Derivation of modes a wave in a cube

Foundational quantum physics
Obsolete theories in physics